Tomáš Majtán (born 30 March 1987) is a Slovak footballer who plays as a forward for Inter Bratislava.

Club career
Majtán scored 16 goals for Inter Bratislava in the 2007–08 Second Division season and became a top goalscorer. In the same season he scored 6 goals in two consecutive  games. On 5 February 2010, he signed a 3.5-year contract for Žilina. He scored his first goal for Žilina in his debut against Dubnica on 27 February 2010. He won the Corgoň Liga title in 2009–10, scoring 4 goals for his new club. On 8 December 2010, Majtán scored his first UEFA Champions League goal, opening the score in their 1–2 home defeat against Spartak Moscow.

Club statistics

Updated to games played as of 9 December 2017.

Honours

Žilina
Slovak Super Liga (1): 2009–10
Slovak Super Cup (1): 2010

References

External links

1987 births
Living people
Footballers from Bratislava
Association football forwards
Slovak footballers
Slovakia under-21 international footballers
Slovak Super Liga players
2. Liga (Slovakia) players
3. Liga (Slovakia) players
Austrian Regionalliga players
Czech First League players
Ekstraklasa players
FK Inter Bratislava players
FC Petržalka players
MŠK Žilina players
FC Baník Ostrava players
Górnik Zabrze players
FK Senica players
FC Spartak Trnava players
1. FK Příbram players
S.S. Racing Club Roma players
Mezőkövesdi SE footballers
MFK Skalica players
Slovak expatriate footballers
Expatriate footballers in the Czech Republic
Expatriate footballers in Poland
Expatriate footballers in Italy
Expatriate footballers in Hungary
Expatriate footballers in Austria
Slovak expatriate sportspeople in the Czech Republic
Slovak expatriate sportspeople in Poland
Slovak expatriate sportspeople in Italy
Slovak expatriate sportspeople in Hungary
Slovak expatriate sportspeople in Austria